The Ford family is a family of African-American politicians from Memphis, Tennessee in the United States. Below is a list of members of the Tennessee-based political family:

Newton Ford (1856–1919), who was a well-respected civic leader around the southern section of Shelby County. Newton Ford was elected as a county squire from 1888 to 1900.
Lewie Ford (1889-1931) started the family funeral business and became allied with E.H. Crump, an influential white politician in Memphis and the state in the early 20th century.
Newton Jackson Ford (1914–1986) was an undertaker and businessman, and his wife Vera (Davis) Ford (1915–1994), were prominent members of the African-American community. N.J. Ford ran for the Tennessee House in 1966 but was not elected. He opened N.J. Ford Funeral Home (later changed to N.J. Ford And Sons Funeral Home) in 1932. 
Harold Ford Sr.  (May 20, 1945- ), who is a Democratic former member of the United States House of Representatives representing the Memphis, Tennessee area for 11 terms—from 1975 until his retirement in 1997
Harold Ford Jr. (May 11, 1970- ), who served five-terms in of the United States House of Representatives from Tennessee's 9th congressional district, centered in Memphis, from 1997 to 2007.
Jake Ford (October 1, 1972- ), who twice unsuccessfully ran for the TN 9th District in 2006 and 2008. 
John N. Ford (May 3, 1942- ), who served in the Memphis City Council in 1971 representing South Memphis' District 6 and served for 30 years in the Tennessee Senate beginning in 1974. 
Kemba Ford, who ran and lost for Memphis City Council in 2011, and ran but lost for TN State House 91st district in 2013. 
Emmitt H. Ford (December 13, 1943 – November 10, 2014), who represented the Tennessee House of Representatives' 86th district encompassing Shelby County from 1975–1981.
Joe Ford (1954-), who was a Shelby County Commissioner and served as interim mayor of Shelby County in 2009 and 2010. 
Justin Ford, who was a Shelby County Commissioner from 2009 to 2014.
James W. Ford (1949-2001), was a Shelby County commissioner.
Edmund Ford (1955- ), who served two terms on the Memphis City Council, elected in October 1999.
Dr. Edmund "Ed" Ford Jr. (1979- ), who has served on the Memphis City Council since 2007. In 2018, he was elected to his cousin Justin's seat on the Shelby County Commission.
Ophelia Ford (July 5, 1950- ), who represented Tennessee Senate's District 29, which covers South Memphis and North Memphis.

See also
List of United States political families

References

Political families of the United States
Baptists from Tennessee
People from Memphis, Tennessee
Tennessee Democrats
 
Democratic Party members of the United States House of Representatives